Edison Eshay David (5 December 1933 – 24 July 2020) was an Iraqi football player who played for the Iraq national team and Al-Quwa Al-Jawiya in the 1950s and 1960s. Born in Iraq, David was of Assyrian descent.

Career
After starting his soccer career at his early teens with local teams, he joined the Iraqi Air Force Club in 1955.  He was selected for the Iraq national football team in 1955 where he played until 1965.

During his years with the Iraqi National teams and the Air Force team, he stood out as one of the best players of his time as he was honoured by the central Iraqi League as the best player in 1958.

He was appointed the Head Coach of the Assyrian which is based in North America. From 1986 to 2011 David ran "Eddie David Soccer Camps" in which he trained and inspired children from ages 4–15 to play soccer and become better people.

Personality and Degrees
He was characterized as a patient, swift, strategic planner as he rose to the peak alongside players like Youra Eshaya and Ammo Samson.  After moving to the United States, he took on many coaching positions for his great experience and honourable coaching certificate from East Germany.

Sports medicine Germany

1973 student of the year, sports medicine, Germany 
 Iraqi League Player of the year 1958.

Iraq

Club

References

1933 births
2020 deaths
Iraqi footballers
Al-Quwa Al-Jawiya players
Assyrian sportspeople
Iraqi Assyrian people
Assyrian footballers
Al-Quwa Al-Jawiya managers
Association football midfielders
Iraqi football managers
Iraq international footballers